Birt is a lunar impact crater located in the eastern half of the Mare Nubium and west of the Rupes Recta. It was named after British selenographer William R. Birt.

Birt is a bowl-shaped formation with a raised rim, slightly intersected along the southeast edge by the much smaller crater Birt A. To the west of Birt, a rille named Rima Birt runs north-northwest in an arc from Birt F to Birt E.

Satellite craters
By convention these features are identified on lunar maps by placing the letter on the side of the crater midpoint that is closest to Birt.

References

External links

 

Impact craters on the Moon